Dominic Simon "Dom" Wood (born 3 January 1978) is an English entertainer, magician and presenter of radio and television, best known as one half of the double act Dick and Dom, with the other being Richard McCourt. From 14 October 2007 to September 2008, he and work partner McCourt presented the Sunday morning show on BBC Radio 1 from 10:00 am – 1:00 pm, but later left the show due to TV commitments.

Magic career
Wood was at one point the youngest member of the magician's society The Magic Circle. He was however later expelled in the wake of disapproval over Dick & Dom in da Bungalow, on which he would occasionally perform and gave away tricks, despite him protesting that other entertainers and magicians had effectively done the same publicly before with no blowback.

His magical achievements and awards include:

 1999 Escaping from a straitjacket on Houdini's birthday
 1998 British Magical Champion
 1998 World Record for Card Tricks
 1996 IBM Shield for Sleight of Hand
 1994 Young Magician of the Year

Television career

Whilst still a student at Exeter College, Wood made an appearance on The Big Breakfast in August 1995 performing an act he called "The Magic Frying Pan" for a competition on the show. The Big Breakfast was touring, going to Wood's hometown of Exeter. The show stationed at Exeter Quay. By audience vote Wood's Act won and he was interview to perform in London. 

Wood first officially appeared on television in 1996 on CBBC's Friday afternoon children's programme Friday Zone.  However this was preceded several years earlier by a brief appearance on children's TV programme Gimmie 5, as a member of public performing in front of the camera on the Quayside in Exeter.  Following this, he presented the CBBC Broom Cupboard until 1998.

From 1999 until 2000 he was the first presenter of the CITV game show Jungle Run.

Along with Richard McCourt ("Dick") he is currently best known as half of the double act Dick and Dom. Their programme Dick & Dom in da Bungalow ran from 2002 to 2006, and won two BAFTAs in 2004 for Best Presenters and Best Children's Entertainment. On this show in 2004, Wood set the world record for largest number of pants put on in one minute. Throughout 2000–2002, the pair also starred in the 2-series TV show Bring it On. 

In 2006, along with Jon Tickle, Wood co-presented the UK pop science show Brainiac's Test Tube Baby, a spin-off of Brainiac: Science Abuse.

He has also co-hosted the BBC Three coverage of the 2007 series of Comic Relief Does Fame Academy.

Dick and Dom presented a daytime version of Are You Smarter Than A 10 Year Old? between 2007 and 2009.

In 2010, Wood was cast in the live-action 3D family comedy movie Horrid Henry: The Movie alongside Richard McCourt as the titular character's fierce cousin-in-law Pimply Paul. The film was released on 29 July 2011.

Also in 2010, Wood wrote and starred in the CBBC show, The Legend of Dick and Dom, where Dick and Dom star as two budding young princes who are on a quest to find the antidote to a terrible plague that consumed Fyredor because Dick dropped the cure. The all-star cast also includes Mannitol (Steve Furst), a wizard who is really bad at doing magic, and Lutin (Chloe Bale).

Absolute Genius with Dick and Dom started in 2013. Dick and Dom won the 2014 Children's Presenter BAFTA Award for the second series of the show.

Author
Wood has co-written several books, including:

 
 
 
 Dominic Wood's Magic Book 
 Dominic Wood's Spooky Magic

Personal life
Wood married Sandi Lee Hughes of the (now defunct) pop band allSTARS*. The couple have two sons, Tommy and Sam.Getty Images McCourt is also the godfather of both children.

He has an older brother Jim who appeared on an episode of Dick and Dom in da Bungalow. He has two other brothers, Matt and Tim.

Wood has been diagnosed as dyslexic. He is a vegetarian. 

Wood ran the annual charity event the Great North Run for the first time in 2007.

See also
Dick & Dom in da Bungalow
Richard McCourt
Dick and Dom

References

External links

BBC Official Biography
Dick and Dom in da bungalow
Dick and Dom's Radio 1 Webpage

1978 births
Living people
People educated at King's College, Taunton
British television presenters
People from Okehampton
British children's television presenters
Television presenters with dyslexia